The Tipton kangaroo rat (Dipodomys nitratoides nitratoides), is a subspecies of the San Joaquin kangaroo rat, a rodent in the family Heteromyidae.

Description
Adult Tipton kangaroo rats have small forefeet, exceptionally large hind feet, and long tail. They have a head and body length of about 100 to 110 millimeters and weigh approximately 35 to 38 grams. The tail length is about 125 to 130 millimeters in length. This subspecies is larger than the Fresno kangaroo rat and smaller than the short-nosed kangaroo rat (D. nitratoides brevinasus).

Distribution
This subspecies lives in ground burrows between the Kern National Wildlife Refuge, Delano, and the natural lands surrounding Lamont (southeast of Bakersfield), Kern County, at the Coles Levee Ecosystem Preserve and in other scattered areas to the south in Kern County, in areas west of Tipton, Pixley, and Earlimart, Pixley National Wildlife Refuge, Allensworth Ecological Reserve, and Allensworth State Historical Park in Tulare County.

Diet
Tipton kangaroo rats eat mainly seeds. They also consume some insects and small amounts of herbaceous vegetation when available.

See also
 Kangaroo rat

References

Further reading
Jameson et al. 1988. California Mammals.
Wilson et al. (editors). 1999. The Smithsonian Book of North American Mammals.
Whitaker (editor). 1998. National Audubon Society Field Guide to North American Mammals, Revised Edition.
Zeiner et al. (editors). 1990. California's Wildlife, Volume III, Mammals.

External links
Federal register documents

Dipodomys
kangaroo rat
Mammals of the United States
Natural history of the Central Valley (California)
San Joaquin Valley
Mammals described in 1894
ESA endangered species